The Walmadjari (Walmajarri) people, also known as Tjiwaling and Wanaseka, are an Aboriginal Australian people of the Kimberley region of Western Australia.

Name
The two names reflect different Walmadjari preferences. Their western bands accept Tjiwaling as an ethnonym for its it a designation peoples neighbouring them further west employ. The eastern bands prefer the Walmadjari autonym, or conversely, define themselves as the Wanaseka, as opposed to the Tjiwaling, side.)

Language
Walmadjari belongs to the Ngumpin–Yapa branch of the Pama-Nyungan language family.

Country
Their southern limits ran along the Canning Stock Route to Kardalapuru (Well 47). Sometime in the latter half of the 19th century, a group of Walmadjari, who are called Ngainan, took over some Gooniyandi territory, the downs north of Christmas Creek between Mellon Spring and Landrigan Cliffs.

Alternative names
 Walmajari, Walmadjeri, Walmade're, Wolmadjari, Walmajeri, Wolmaijari.
 Wulumari, Wolmeri, Wolmera.
 Walmaharri, Walmaharry, Wolmaharry.
 Warigari Pundur (Gugadja exonym signifying 'cannibals')
 Walmajai. (Nyigina pronunciation)
 Wulumarai.
 Wanmadjari.
 Tjiwaling (Mangala exonym)
 Djualin.
 Tjiwali.
 Tjiwalindja, Djiwalinja.
 Djuwali, Djiwalinj.
 Ngadjukura. (language name)
 Pitangu. (pejorative Gugadja ethnonym)
 Wanaeka, Waneiga.
 Ngainan, Nganang.
 Warmala. (generic term for several Western Desert tribes).

Notable Walmadjari
Ningali Lawford (1967–2019), actress
Jimmy Pike (c.1940–2002), artist

Notes

Citations

Sources

Aboriginal peoples of Western Australia
Mid West (Western Australia)
Pilbara